Anne Taylor (née Downey; born 23 October 1953) is a former netball player who represented New Zealand on three occasions, including in the 1975 World Netball Championships.

Early life
Anne Taylor attended Matamata College in Matamata in the Waikato region of New Zealand's North Island and then obtained a diploma in teaching of commerce and physical education from the Auckland Teachers' College, later known as the Auckland College of Education and now part of the University of Auckland.

Netball career
Taylor had two elder sisters, Claire and Faye, who were both netball players, and she followed in their footsteps. She played for the Arahi netball team in Auckland at the age of 16 and then joined the Auckland team. While playing for Auckland she was selected for the North Island team to play the South Island. She was then chosen in 1974 for the New Zealand Under-24 team, which toured England and Australia and was the first New Zealand team to be coached by Dame Lois Muir. Taylor played in the Goal Shooter (GS), Goal attack (GA) and Wing attack (WA) positions.

Taylor was selected for the New Zealand national netball team, known as the Silver Ferns, for the 1975 world championships, which were held in Auckland, making her debut against Fiji on 26 August, and playing in two other matches. New Zealand came third in the tournament.

Later life

In 1974, Taylor returned to Matamata College, as a teacher of accounting and physical education. Married to Phil Taylor, she left the school in 1978 to have four children, returning to the College in 1985. Her two daughters went to the same school and played for its netball team, which Taylor coached for a number of years.

References

1953 births
Living people
New Zealand international netball players
1975 World Netball Championships players
University of Auckland alumni
People from Matamata
New Zealand schoolteachers
Sportspeople from Waikato